Jones Publishing, located in Iola, Wisconsin produces a number of publication dealing with collectibles including Teddy Bear & Friends which is dedicated to the collection and hobby of teddy bears and soft sculpture collecting and  Dolls. They also publish craft magazines including Doll Crafter & Costuming, Crafts Report, and Fired Arts & Crafts.

References

External links 
Jones Publishing
Teddy Bear Review website

Publishing companies of the United States
Companies based in Wisconsin